Borderline is the ninth album by Ry Cooder and was released in 1980 on the Warner Bros label.

Track listing

Side one 
 "634–5789" (Steve Cropper, Eddie Floyd) – 2:56
 "Speedo" (Esther Navarro) – 3:20
 "Why Don't You Try Me" (E. Young) – 4:54
 "Down in the Boondocks" (Joe South) – 3:21
 "Johnny Porter" (Bobby Ray Appleberry, William Cuomo) – 5:21

Side two 
 "The Way We Make a Broken Heart" (John Hiatt) – 4:28
 "Crazy 'Bout an Automobile" (William R. Emerson) – 5:03
 "The Girls from Texas" (James Lewis, Jimmy Holiday, Cliff Chambers) – 4:40
 "Borderline" (Ry Cooder) – 3:19
 "Never Make Your Move Too Soon" (Will Jennings, Nesbert Hooper Jr.) – 6:08

Charts

Personnel 
Source: album cover
 Ry Cooder – guitar, vibes, vocals
 Jim Keltner – drums
 George "Baboo" Pierre – percussion
 Tim Drummond – bass
 Reggie McBride – bass
 William D. Smith – piano, organ, vocals
 John Hiatt – guitar, vocals
 Jesse Harms – synthesizer
 Bobby King – vocals
 Willie Greene, Jr. – vocals

Technical
 Leslie Morris – production assistant
 Lee Herschberg – recording, mixing
 Carlos Ruano Llopis  – artwork

References 

1980 albums
Ry Cooder albums
Warner Records albums
Albums produced by Ry Cooder